In computer programming, an input mask refers to a string expression, defined by a developer, that constrains user input. It can be said to be a template, or set format that entered data must conform to, ensuring data integrity by preventing transcription errors. The syntax of this string expression differs between implementations, but the fundamental input types are all supported.

Some frequent uses of input masks include entry of telephone numbers, ZIP or postal codes, times and dates.

e.g. When entering into a text box a phone number on a data capture form, in the format "(111) 111 1111" the area code brackets, the space between the number and the area code will automatically be placed in.

Generally speaking, an input mask is a user-generated set of rules; e.g., a maximum of 45 characters. This kind of string is useful in finding reports and healthcare files.

An example would be: LL00 00L – this in detail shows what should be included.

References 

User interface techniques
Data quality